The 1997 Spanish motorcycle Grand Prix was the third round of the 1997 Grand Prix motorcycle racing season. It took place on 4 May 1997 at the Circuito Permanente de Jerez.

500 cc classification

250 cc classification

125 cc classification

References

Spanish motorcycle Grand Prix
Spanish
Motorcycle Grand Prix